"Cool" is a song from the 1957 musical West Side Story. Leonard Bernstein composed the music and Stephen Sondheim wrote the lyrics. This was the first song they wrote together, and Sondheim later recollects that Bernstein must have written the opening line ("Boy, boy, crazy boy") since he himself was not prone to writing  melismatically.  This song is known for its fugal treatment of a jazz figure, described by one writer as "possibly the most complex instrumental music heard on Broadway to date". In the 1957 musical, the song is performed by Riff, the leader of the Jet Gang to calm their nerves before the rumble. This is likely to show he holds the gang together despite his flaws. This is however changed in the 1961 and 2021 film adaptations.

Summary in the 1961 film
Since the death of Riff (Russ Tamblyn), Ice (Tucker Smith) takes over as the leader of the Jets and he reasons with his team to play it cool.

Summary in the 2021 film
Hours before the rumble, Tony (Ansel Elgort) sings it to Riff (Mike Faist) to get the Jets to call off the fight while playing Keep Away with the gun bought by Riff.

In popular culture
In 2011, actor Harry Shum Jr. performed the song, as his character Mike Chang from TV series Glee, in the third episode of season 3, "Asian F" (aired on October 4).

An episode of Animaniacs features a parody version as "Coo Bird" sung by Bobby of The Goodfeathers. The song is also parodied in the Flight of the Conchords episode "The Tough Brets" with the song "Stay Cool, Bret".

The Castle episode "Cool Boys" has Richard Castle and Detective Slaughter sing it to distract some criminals holding them at gunpoint.

British sketch show Horrible Histories parodied this song as a song about the English Civil War.

References

Songs with music by Leonard Bernstein
Songs from West Side Story
1957 songs
Songs written by Stephen Sondheim